The  is a kei car manufactured by the Japanese carmaker Daihatsu. The Tanto Exe made its debut at the 2009 Tokyo Motor Show and was launched on 24 December 2009.

It was based on the L375 series Tanto and designed to compete with models such as the Honda Life, Nissan Moco and Suzuki Wagon R. The Tanto Exe was more comfort-oriented than the standard Tanto which more oriented for a flexible seat arrangement and maximum interior space. The Tanto Exe/Lucra Custom, a sports-oriented version of the Tanto Exe/Lucra with sports styling, was also available. The Tanto Exe/Lucra series was available in two engine options: a naturally aspirated 658 cc KF-VE and a turbocharged 658 cc KF-DET three-cylinder petrol units mated to a continuously variable transmission on front-wheel drive models and 4-speed automatic unit on four-wheel drive models.

The Tanto Exe series was discontinued on 2 October 2014, due to declining sales caused by the launch of the LA600 series Tanto a year earlier. The Lucra series followed later on 1 April 2015 due to changing tax consumption rules.

Gallery

References 

Tanto Exe
Cars introduced in 2009
2010s cars
Microvans
Hatchbacks
Front-wheel-drive vehicles
All-wheel-drive vehicles
Vehicles with CVT transmission